Jim McKeown may refer to:

 James McKeown (missionary), Scottish missionary who founded the Church of Pentecost
 James McKeown, Irish football goalkeeper who plays for Grimsby Town
 Jim McKeown (soccer) (born 1956), retired American soccer defender
 Jim McKeown (racing driver), Australian racing driver

See also
James McKeown (born 1989), English-born Irish professional footballer